Patrice Tlhopane Motsepe (born 28 January 1962) is a South African mining billionaire businessman. Since 12 March 2021, he has been serving as the President of the Confederation of African Football. He is the founder and executive chairman of African Rainbow Minerals, which has interests in gold, ferrous metals, base metals, and platinum. He sits on several company boards, including being the non-executive chairman of Harmony Gold, the world's 12th largest gold mining company, and the deputy chairman of Sanlam. In 2012, Motsepe was named South Africa's richest man, topping the Sunday Times' annual Rich List with an estimated fortune of R20.07 billion ($1 billion).

In 2003, he became the owner of football club Mamelodi Sundowns.

In 2013, he joined The Giving Pledge, committing to give half of his wealth to charitable causes.

Early life and education
Patrice Motsepe was born to 
Kgosi Augustine Motsepe, a chief of the Mmakau branch of the Tswana people, who had previously been a schoolteacher and who was later a small businessman as the owner of a Spaza shop which was popular with mine workers. It was from this shop that Motsepe learned basic business principles from his father, as well as first-hand exposure to mining.

He earned a Bachelor of Arts degree at the University of Swaziland and a law degree from the University of the Witwatersrand. He specialised in mining and business law.

Career
In 1994, he became the first black partner in the law firm Bowman Gilfillan—the same year that Nelson Mandela was elected as the country's first black president. While the new government began promoting black empowerment and entrepreneurship; Motsepe founded Future Mining, which provided contract mining services that included the cleaning of gold dust from inside mine shafts for the Vaal Reefs Gold mine, and implemented a system of worker remuneration that combined a low base salary with a profit-sharing bonus.

Mining 
In 1997, with gold prices at a low, he purchased marginal gold mines from AngloGold under favourable finance terms. AngloGold sold Motsepe six gold mine shafts for $7.7 million allowing him to repay the debt out of the future earnings of the company now known as African Rainbow Minerals.

This was repeated in a string of deals and Motsepe set up a firm to begin buying the operating mines that would become the source of his wealth. In 1999 he teamed up with two of his associates to form Greene and Partners Investments.

The Black Economic Empowerment (BEE) laws introduced after the 1994 elections have been instrumental in cementing Motsepe's position in the mining industry in South Africa. A business must have a minimum of 26% black ownership to be considered for a mining license.

Since 2004, Motsepe has been a non-executive director of Absa Group and Sanlam.

In 2002 when it was listed on the JSE Security Exchange, African Rainbow Minerals joined with Harmony Gold Mining Ltd. and the company's name changed to ARMgold. Motsepe is also the founder of African Rainbow Minerals Platinum (Proprietary) Limited and ARM Consortium Limited, which later equally split ownership with Anglo American Platinum Corp Ltd. From 2005, Motsepe was Chairman of Teal Exploration and Mining Incorporated. Motsepe is also chairman of Ubuntu-Botho Investments, Non-Executive chairman of Harmony Gold Mining Co Ltd. and deputy Chairman of Sanlam Ltd. Motsepe has been president of South Africa's Chamber of Commerce and Industry.

Financial 
In 2003, Motsepe created Ubuntu-Botho Investments (UBI) (and in 2019 he owned 55% of it). In 2004 UBI entered into a BEE deal with insurance and financial services company Sanlam. That deal ended in 2014 when the debt had been paid and UBI acquired 13.5%  of Sanlam but UBI has a 18.1% voting stake in Sanlam as its BEE partner. UBI then started African Rainbow Capital (ARC), a wholly owned subsidiary of UBI. ARC's joint chief executive is Johan van Zyl, former executive of Sanlam. ARC has holdings in more than 40 companies, including TymeBank, industrial group Afrimat, agricultural company BKB, telecommunications company Rain, luxury property estate Val de Vie, and a minority stake in Alexander Forbes, the pension fund administrator.

Sport 
Motsepe is the owner of Mamelodi Sundowns F.C. a Premier soccer league club. In November 2019, Motsepe bought a 37% stake in the Blue Bulls Co. The other major shareholders are Remgro (37%) and Blue Bulls Rugby Union (26%). 

In November 2020, Motsepe announced that he would become a candidate to become CAF's president. Quickly accused of being actively supported by FIFA - despite its duty of reserve and neutrality - and its President Gianni Infantino, who would seek to obtain the votes of Africa for future re-election, Motsepe was elected on 12 March 2021, after that all four other candidates had withdrawn their candidacies. His son Thlopie Motsepe took over as Mamelodi Sundowns new chairman after he became a new president of CAF.

Advocacy 
In 2011, he was named the interim chairman of the Black Business Council, and is a founding member and former president of one of South Africa's most influential business advocacy and lobby group Business Unity SA (BUSA).

Recognition 

Motsepe won South Africa's Best Entrepreneur Award in 2002.
In 2004, he was voted 39th among the South African Broadcasting Corporation's Great South Africans. In 2008, he was reported as the 503rd-richest person in the world, according to the Forbes 2019 list of The World's Billionaires, then ranked as the 962nd-wealthiest person in the world, and the third-wealthiest South African for 2019. In 2020, Motsepe was ranked as the 1,307th-wealthiest person in the world by Forbes, with a reported fortune of US$2.1 billion.

Controversy 

In January 2020, at a World Economic Forum dinner in Davos, Patrice Motsepe publicly told US President Donald Trump that "Africa loves him". Faced with the indignant reactions that this statement provoked throughout the African continent, the billionaire apologised, explaining "I do not have the right to speak on behalf of anybody except myself".

Personal life
Motsepe is married to Dr. Precious Moloi, a physician and fashion entrepreneur. They have three children. He is the brother of Tshepo Motsepe and Bridgette Radebe, and the brother-in-law of both President Cyril Ramaphosa and Minister Jeff Radebe.

References

External links
 What a lot he’s got in The Sowetan of 6–7 March 2008.
 Patrice Motsepe's ups and downs
 [https://web.archive.org/web/20061103003048/http://www.blackentrepreneurprofile.com/profile-full/archive/2004/october/article/patrice-motsepe/ Biography in Black Entrepreneur Profile]
 African Rainbow Minerals website
 'Nationalise Motsepe's wealth' News24''

1962 births
Living people
People from Ga-Rankuwa
South African Tswana people
South African billionaires
South African businesspeople
Giving Pledgers
21st-century philanthropists
University of Eswatini alumni
University of the Witwatersrand alumni
Association football executives
Presidents of the Confederation of African Football